"Intoxicated" is a song by French DJ and record producer Martin Solveig and American electronic duo GTA. The song was released as a digital download in the Netherlands on 19 January 2015 and in France on 23 February 2015. The song peaked at number 15 on the French Singles Chart and number 5 on the UK Singles Chart, giving Martin Solveig his first UK top 10 single. The song also charted in Austria, Belgium, Germany, Ireland, Netherlands, Scotland and Switzerland.

Music video
A music video to accompany the release of "Intoxicated" was first released onto YouTube on 19 January 2015 at a total length of three minutes and fourteen seconds. As of August 2019, the music video has received over 152 million views on YouTube.

In popular culture
The song is well known as New York Yankees first baseman Anthony Rizzo's walk-up music.

Intoxicated is playable on Just Dance Unlimited as part of Just Dance 2021

Intoxicated also appeared in the video game Rocket League.

In 2018 and 2019, the song was featured in an advertising campaign for Pine-Sol, dubbed the "Cleaning Dance Challenge".

Track listing

Charts

Weekly charts

Year-end charts

Certifications

Release history

References

2014 songs
2015 singles
Martin Solveig songs
Songs written by Martin Solveig
Spinnin' Records singles
Song recordings produced by Martin Solveig